The German special forces include the Special Operations Command (Kommando Spezialkräfte, KSK) of the German Army and the Naval Special Forces Command (Kommando Spezialkräfte Marine, KSM) of the German Navy. Both are regular units and fully integrated into the branches of the German Armed Forces. During operations, special forces personnel are under the command of the special operations division of the Bundeswehr Joint Operations Command (Einsatzführungskommando der Bundeswehr) in Potsdam, a branch of the Joint Support LlslkekService (Streitkräftebasis).

Besides the KSK and KSM, there are numerous specialized units that are able to support special forces operations.

Special Forces

Army Special Forces 

A large majority of German special forces are part of the Kommando Spezialkräfte (KSK). The unit was originally founded in 1996 to expand Germanys limited counter-terrorisms capabilities at the time. The KSK is a brigade-level unit that is stationed in Calw. The unit is under the command of the Rapid Response Forces Division (Division Schnelle Kräfte) and is made up of around 1,100 soldiers. Most of them serve in the support forces department.

 Kommando Spezialkräfte
HQ KSK
 Psychological Service
 Language Service
Force Development Group
 Operational Forces
1st Commando Company
2nd Commando Company
3rd Commando Company
4th Commando Company
Special Commando Company
Training Centre
 Support Forces
HQ & Support Company
Signal Company
Support Company
Medical Centre

Naval Special Forces 

The Kommando Spezialkräfte Marine (KSM) was founded in 2014 and was based upon the Commando Frogmen Company (Kampfschwimmerkompanie), one of Germany's oldest special operations units. The KSM is based in Eckernförde and is part of the 1st Flotilla (Einsatzflottille 1) in Kiel.

 Kommando Spezialkräfte Marine
 HQ KSM
 S1 - Personnel
 S2/6 - Intelligence/Communications
 S3 - Operations
 S4 - Logistics
 Operations Support Team Air (Einsatzgruppe Luft)
 Diver Depot
 Vehicle Repair Squad
 Analysis & Development Group
 Special Operation Medical Support Team (SOMST)
 Commando Frogmen Company
 Commando Frogmen Teams (Kampfschwimmereinsatzteams, KSET)
 Operations Support Team Sea (Einsatzgruppe See)
 Tactics and Training Group (Gruppe Grundlagen, Verfahren, Taktik und Ausbildung, GVTA)

Special Forces Aviation 

The KSK is currently supported by the German Army Aviation Corps and - since reorientation of the Bundeswehr in 2010 - by the helicopter force of the German Air Force. From 2015, the KSK gets its own aviation component made up of 15 EC645 T2 utility helicopters. They will be part of the Helicopter Wing 64 at the Holzdorf Air Base.

The KSM is supported by the Naval Air Wing 5 in Nordholz which operates the Westland Lynx and Westland Sea King.

Specialized Forces

Special Operations Training Centre 

Originally established in 1979 as an international school for long-range reconnaissance patrol team, the Ausbildungszentrum Spezielle Operationen is responsible for initial and further training of special and specialized forces. The centre has the size of a regiment, is subordinate to Army Training Commando and based in Pfullendorf.

Specialized Forces Army 

In order to close the gap between the KSK and regular infantry, the German Army developed a concept of specialized forces (Specialized Forces of the Army with Expanded Basic Qualifications for Special Operations, EGB - Spezialierte Kräfte des Heeres mit erweiteter Grundgefähigung für spezielle Operationen, EGB). This includes a numerous of army SOF units, mostly airborne forces. A distinction is made between the main operational forces and support forces. All of them are independent units respectively part of regular formations.

In 2013, the operational forces consists of:
 4 x Fallschirmjäger Commando companies with each 4 platoons
 4 x Fallschirmjäger pathfinder platoons
 1 x Longe Range Reconnaissance Patrol Company
 2 x airborne engineer platoons
 2 x HUMINT HQ Squads
 4 x HUMINT Squads

The support force are made up of:
 2 x airborne reconnaissance companies
 4 x K9 platoons of the Fallschirmjäger
 4 x Fallschirmjäger Joint Fire Support Coordination Teams
 4 x Fallschirmjäger Joint Fire Support Teams
 1 x electronic warfare platoon
 several units, e.g. medics and PSYOPS

Fleet Protection Forces 

From 1997 until spring 2014, both naval special forces (commando frogmen) and naval specialized forces (mine clearance divers and boarding trained naval infantrymen) were organized into the Naval Specialized Deployment Forces, a battalion-sized unit with four companies. The idea was to combine all specialized skills into one single formation. In the beginning, it was planned to create a force protection company beside the Boarding Company to support operations of the commando frogmen.

Through the reorientation of the Bundeswehr, the commando frogmen got their own battalion while naval infantry (including HUMINT experts) and mine clearance divers were summarized into the Naval Force Protection Battalion (Seebataillon) in Eckernförde. The formation is often described as the "multi-tool of the German Navy". So, the battalion is able to support special forces operations.

Counter-Terrorism 

GSG 9 der Bundespolizei (Border Protection Group 9 of the Federal Police), formerly Grenzschutzgruppe 9, is the Police Tactical Unit of the German Federal Police. Their counterparts at the state level are the Special Deployment Commandos (Spezialeinsatzkommandos).

References

 
Bundeswehr
German Army (1956–present)
German Navy
Germany